Guilleminea is a small genus of plants in the family Amaranthaceae. They are sometimes known as matweeds. These are prostrate, mat-forming perennial herbs growing from taproots. The best known species is perhaps Guilleminea densa, the small matweed, which is present on most continents and is often a weed. The other species are native to the Americas. The genus was named after the French botanist Jean Baptiste Antoine Guillemin.

Species

The genus contains eight species including:

Guilleminea brittonii Standl., 1967
Guilleminea chacoensis Pedersen, 2000
Guilleminea densa (Willd.) Moq., 1849 - Small
Guilleminea elongata Mears, 1967
Guilleminea fragilis Pedersen, 2000
Guilleminea gracilis R.E.Fr, 1905
Guilleminea hirsuta Pedersen, 2000
Guilleminea lanuginosa (Poir.) Hook.f, 1880

References

External links

Jepson Manual Treatment
USDA Plants Profile: North American Species

Amaranthaceae
Amaranthaceae genera